Thomas Oscar Bruce (born 10 February 1983) is an English cricketer. Bruce is a left-handed batsman who bowls slow left-arm orthodox. He was born in Bampton, Oxfordshire.

Bruce studied at Durham University, where he captained the cricket team. While studying for his degree, Bruce made his first-class debut for Durham UCCE against Somerset in 2005. He made two further first-class appearances in 2005, against Leicestershire and Durham. In his three first-class matches, he scored 86 runs at an average of 43.00, with a high score of 26.

References

External links
Thomas Bruce at ESPNcricinfo
Thomas Bruce at CricketArchive

1983 births
Living people
People from Bampton, Oxfordshire
Alumni of Hatfield College, Durham
English cricketers
Durham MCCU cricketers